The Limestone River is a river in the Hudson Bay drainage basin in Northern Manitoba, Canada. Its flows from Sakawisew Bay on Limestone Lake to the Nelson River, just downstream from Limestone Generating Station and dam and adjacent to the Fox Lake Cree Nation and to the abandoned community of Sundance.

See also
List of rivers of Manitoba

References

External links

Rivers of Northern Manitoba
Tributaries of Hudson Bay